The Women's Sailboard (Mistral One Design Class) Competition at the 1996 Summer Olympics was held from 23 July to 29 July 1996, in Savannah, Georgia, United States. Points were awarded for placement in each race. Eleven races were scheduled. Nine races were sailed. Each sailor had two discards.

Results 

DNF = Did Not Finish, DNC= Did Not Come to the starting area, DSQ = Disqualified, PMS = Premature Start, YMP = Yacht Materially Prejudiced

Daily standings

Conditions at the Mistral course area's

Notes

References 
 
 
 

 
 
 

Mistral One Design Women's
Mistral One Design competitions
Oly
Sail